This article records new taxa of fossil plants that are scheduled to be described during the year 2021, as well as other significant discoveries and events related to paleobotany that are scheduled to occur in the year 2021.

Ferns and fern allies

Bennettitales

Cycadales

Ginkgoales

Vladimariales

Conifers

Araucariaceae

Cheirolepidiaceae

Cupressaceae

Pinaceae

Podocarpaceae

Other conifers

Flowering plants

Basal angiosperms

Unplaced non-eudicots

Magnoliids

Canellales

Monocots

Alismatid monocots

Lilioid monocots

Commelinid monocots

Commelinid monocot research
 A study on the evolutionary history of palms throughout the Cenozoic era, aiming to determine the impact of Cenozoic environmental changes on the diversification and biogeography of palms, is published by Lim et al. (2021).
 Pollens of member of the family Poaceae preserving the same morphological characteristics as that of modern cereal grains are described from a sedimentary core from Lake Acıgöl (Turkey) by Andrieu-Ponel et al. (2021), who interpret this finding as indicative of the presence of proto-cereals in Anatolia since 2.3 million years ago, likely evolving from wild Poaceae as a result of trampling, nitrogen enrichment of soils and browsing by large mammal herds, and evaluate possible benefits from the availability of these proto-cereals for early hominins.

Basal eudicots

Proteales

Superasterids

Campanulid euasterids

Lamiid euasterids

Non euasterids

Superrosids

Fabids

Fabales

Fagales

Fagalean research
 A study on wood anatomy in extant and fossil members of Fagales is published by Wheeler, Baas & Manchester who transfer two Eocene species from Myrica to Morella.

Malpighiales

Oxalidales

Rosales

Malvids

Malvales

Myrtales

Sapindales

Non eurosid superrosids

Other angiosperms

Other plants

Palynology

Palynological research
 Strother & Foster (2021) describe an assemblage of fossil spores from the Ordovician (Tremadocian) of Australia, representing a morphology that was intermediate morphology between confirmed land plant spores and earlier forms of uncertain phylogenetic placement, and evaluate the implications of these fossils for the knowledge of the evolution of land plants from their algal ancestors.
 A study on the fossil pollen record from New Zealand, dating from 100 million years ago to the present, is published by Prebble et al. (2021), who report evidence indicating that Cretaceous diversification was closely followed by an increase in flowering plants frequency, but their maximum frequency did not occur until the Eocene.
 A study on changes of abundance in spores and pollen record from the Danish Basin, and on their implications for the knowledge of the impact of the Triassic–Jurassic extinction event on land plants, is published by Lindström (2021).
 A study on the vegetation history in the southwestern Balkans, as indicated by pollen from the sedimentary record in the Lake Ohrid extending to 1.36 million years ago, is published by Donders et al. (2021).

Research 
 A study on changes of the morphological complexity of reproductive structures of land plants throughout their evolutionary history, based on data from fossil and extant land plants, is published by Leslie, Simpson & Mander (2021).
 Revision of Silurian (Wenlock to Přídolí) assemblages of polysporangiophytes with dispersed spores and cryptospores, aiming to determine the relationship between Silurian plant evolution and climate changes linked with perturbations of the global carbon cycle, is published by Pšenička et al. (2021).
 Reconstruction of the structure and development of the rooting system of Asteroxylon mackiei is presented by Hetherington et al. (2021).
 A study on factors influencing the extent of arboreal vegetation during the Late Paleozoic icehouse is published by Matthaeus et al. (2021), who interpret their findings as indicating that Pangaea could have supported widespread arboreal plant growth and forest cover based on leaf water constraints, but the forest extent was restricted because of impact of freezing on plants, and estimate that contracting forest cover increased net global surface runoff by up to 6.1%.
 Description of the reproductive organs of the lycopsids from the Upper Devonian Wutong Formation (China), and a study on the ability of the sporophyll units for wind dispersal, is published by Zhou et al. (2021), who name new form species Lepidophylloides longshanensis and Lepidophylloides changxingensis.
 An exceptionally well preserved Brasilodendron-like lycopsid forest containing over 150 upright stumps is described from an early Permian postglacial landscape of western Gondwana (Paraná Basin, Brazil) by Mottin et al. (2021).
 A study on the anatomy of Stigmaria asiatica is published by Chen et al. (2021).
 Stump casts of Sigillaria, preserving traces of internal anatomy, are described from the earliest Permian Wuda Tuff (China) by D'Antonio et al. (2021).
 A study aiming to determine probable causes of the world-wide proliferation of members of Isoetales, particularly Pleuromeia, during and in the aftermath of the Permian–Triassic extinction event, and evaluating the implications of this proliferation for the knowledge of environmental stresses during and in the aftermath of this extinction event, is published by Looy, van Konijnenburg-van Cittert & Duijnstee (2021).
 New fossil material of Saportaea salisburioides, providing new information on leaf morphology and growth of this plant, is described from the Permian Umm Irna Formation (Jordan) by Kerp et al. (2021), who interpret their findings as indicating that Saportaea grandifolia and Baiera virginiana were synonyms of S. salisburioides, and possibly indicating that the fructification belonging to the genus Nystroemia is a part of Saportaea.
 Description of Geinitzia reichenbachii from its gross morphology to the cellular scale, and a study on the likely ecology of this conifer, is published by Moreau et al. (2021).
 A study on the evolutionary history of the family Cycadaceae, based on genomic data and fossil record, is published by Liu et al. (2021).
 Well-preserved recurved cupules of seed plants are described from the Lower Cretaceous of China by Shi et al. (2021), who interpret the structure of these cupules as consistent with the recurved form and development of the second integument in the bitegmic anatropous ovules of flowering plants, and evaluate the implications of these fossils for the knowledge of the origin of the flowering plants.
 Taxonomically diverse flora from the Seafood Salad locality, found ~65 m below the Cretaceous-Paleogene boundary in the Hell Creek Formation (Montana, United States), is described by Wilson, Wilson Mantilla & Strӧmberg (2021), who study the affinities of plants of this locality and compare them with other Late Cretaceous floras of the Western Interior.
 A study on the timing of the origin of the flowering plants, based on data from fossil record and from the diversity of extant members of this group, is published by Silvestro et al. (2021), who interpret their findings as indicating that several flowering plant families originated in the Jurassic.
 A study on the diversity of insect damage types in fossil plants from the Cretaceous (Albian to Cenomanian) Dakota Formation (United States), evaluating their implications for the knowledge of the early evolution of angiosperm florivory and associated pollination, is published by Xiao et al. (2021).
 New fossil material of Callianthus dilae is described from the Lower Cretaceous Yixian Formation (China) by Wang et al. (2021), who reconstruct the whole plant of Callianthus, interpreting it as an aquatic flowering plant.
 A study on the anatomy of the epidermal features of the floating leaves of Quereuxia angulata from the Upper Cretaceous Yong'ancun Formation (China) is published by Liang et al. (2021).
 A study on plant extinction and ecological change in tropical forests resulting from the Cretaceous–Paleogene extinction event, based on data from fossil pollen and leaves from Colombia, is published by Carvalho et al. (2021), who report evidence indicative of a long interval of low plant diversity in the Neotropics after the end-Cretaceous extinction, and the emergence of forests with a structure resembling modern Neotropical rainforests, with a closed canopy and multistratal structure dominated by flowering plants, during the Paleocene.
 A study on the impact of the mid-Eocene greenhouse warming event on floras from southernmost South America is published by Fernández et al. (2021).
 Evidence from middle Eocene-middle Miocene tuffaceous deposits of central and northern Patagonia, indicating that soils, vegetation, insects and mammal herbivores began to record diverse traits related to the presence of grasslands with mosaic vegetation since middle Eocene, is presented by Bellosi et al. (2021).
 A study on Middle Miocene microfloral assemblages from ten localities in the Madrid Basin (Spain), providing evidence of prevalence of open habitats with grass-dominated, savannah-like vegetation under a warm and semi-arid climatic regime in the Iberian Peninsula in the Middle Miocene, is published by Casas-Gallego et al. (2021).
 Crump et al. (2021) present a record of vegetation from the Last Interglacial based on ancient DNA from lake sediment from the Baffin Island (Canada), and report evidence of major ecosystem changes in the Arctic in response to warmth, including a ~400 km northward range shift of dwarf birch relative to today.

Deaths
Alan Graham (1934–2021), passed away on 8 July 2021.  Graham earned his PhD in 1962 under the guidance of Chester A. Arnold, and was noted for a career studying the Cenozoic paleobotany of the Caribbean and Central America.

References 

2021 in paleontology
Paleobotany